Bear Creek is the fourth studio album by American singer-songwriter Brandi Carlile. The album was released June 5, 2012, through Columbia Records. The album was produced by Grammy Award winner Trina Shoemaker. The title of the album refers to the Bear Creek Studio at which the majority of the album was recorded.

Singles
The first single from the album was "That Wasn't Me," which was released April 3, 2012. The song peaked at No. 5 on the US Triple A radio format.

The second single, "Keep Your Heart Young," was sent to Triple A radio stations on November 5, 2012. It peaked at No. 38 (December 7, 2012).

Commercial performance
The album debuted at number ten on the US Billboard 200, making it her first ever top ten on the chart.

Track listing

Personnel
All credits here are listed as printed in the album booklet. Personnel are listed alphabetically with the primary artists listed separately.
Brandi Carlile - vocals, guitar, piano, organ, handclaps, electric guitar, producer
Phil Hanseroth - bass, vocals, handclaps, percussion, tambourine, piano, producer
Tim Hanseroth - guitar, vocals, banjo, ukulele, handclaps, percussion, electric guitars, producer, additional recording
Jeb Bows - mandolin, violin
Matt Chamberlain - drums, handclaps, percussion
Jon Ervie - additional recording
Jared Faw - piano
Frogs - Bear Creek frogs
Jason Hall - engineer
Michelle Holm - art direction
Jay Joyce - mandolin, producer, engineer
Frank Liddell - producer
Allison Miller - drums, percussion, handclaps
Josh Neumann - cello, tambourine
Frank Ockenfels - photography
Dave Palmer - piano
Trina Shoemaker - producer, engineer, mixer
Jerry Streeter - assistant engineer
Matt Wheeler - assistant producer, engineer
Mark Williams - A&R

Charts

References

External links
 BrandiCarlile.com — official site

2012 albums
Brandi Carlile albums
Columbia Records albums
Albums recorded at Bear Creek Studio
Country folk albums